Hypochalcia fulvosquamella is a species of snout moth in the genus Hypochalcia. It was described by Ragonot in 1887. It was described from Ala-Tau.

References

Moths described in 1887
Phycitini